Pterolophia banksi is a species of beetle in the family Cerambycidae. It was described by Stephan von Breuning in 1938. It is known from Borneo.

References

banksi
Beetles described in 1938